GB-PVR was a PVR (personal video recorder aka digital video recorder) application, running on Microsoft Windows, whose main function was scheduling TV recordings and playing back live TV. GB-PVR is no longer under active development and has been superseded by NextPVR, also known as nPVR.

GB-PVR also acts as a home media center software with a digital video recorder, a radio station online tuner, a music and movie player, a library of images and other features.

Although GB-PVR supports open interfaces, the core engine code is closed. However developing personal plug-ins is an option to extend the application and these can be closed or open source, depending on the developer's interests. These plug-ins can be developed in C#, VB.NET or C++ and some examples are available in the GB-PVR official Forums and the GB-PVR Documentation wiki websites. The softwarewas developed with an interface which allows user to change the skin view or other graphic elements as the wallpaper.

GB-PVR is mostly an MPEG recording and playback system, but may also play other non-MPG content such as AVI (DivX/Xvid), WMV, and other formats that are supported by the codecs installed into a computer's.

It requires a supported TV tuner card, a VMR9 capable display adapter (video card), and a supported MPEG2 Decoder. Other requirements are listed on the GB-PVR web site.

Features

 Integrated graphical user interface to manage all functionality
10-foot user interface for large screen displays
 TV Guide for scheduling of recordings
 Support for season recordings
 Support for automatically converting recordings to DivX/Xvid/WMV/iPod etc.
 Support for manual recordings on a specified channel at a specified time
 Timeshift television allowing for pausing live TV etc.
 Multidec support enabling the use of a wide range of softcams and other DVB plugins.
 Teletext
 DVB Subtitles
 Support for recording multiple digital channels at the same time with 1 tuner card when channels are on the same frequency
 SRT Subtitles
 Access to music, videos and photos inside the computer.
 Net radio
 FM radio
 Support for HDTV
 Multi-lingual support, with language packs available for many languages.

NextPVR
NextPVR is the successor of GB-PVR 1.4.7 (August 29, 2009), and includes most features of GB-PVR, and others.  it was at revision 5.1.0.

Supported capture cards

Capture or tuner cards are devices that allows a computer to record video signal, receive television signal and playback video. Some examples of capture cards are:

Analog TV cards 
These capture cards are the most popular as they allow to receive television signals with a computer, moreover some of them also act as video capture, recording television programs in the computer. Some examples are:
 Hauppauge
 Adaptec
 ATI
 AVerMedia
 Conexant
 and more...

Digital TV cards 
Depending on the type of device these cards can allow to tune the reception of digital signals as DVB-T and DVB-S, ATSC HDTV or QAM HDTV signals. These devices also can include BDA drivers. Some examples are listed below:

DVB-T AND DVB-S DEVICES
	Hauppauge
	Fusion HDTV
	ATI HDTV
	Kworld
       and more...
ATSC HDTV DEVICES
	Fusion HDTV
	Hauppauge 
	AverMedia
	SiliconDust
QAM HDTV DEVICES
	OnAir GT 
	SiliconDust HDHomeRun 
	Hauppauge HVR-1600 
	Hauppauge HVR-1800
GO7007SB BASED DEVICES
	Generic Conexant “Blackbird” based card 
	Plextor PX-M402U, PX-TV402U 
	Lifeview TV Walker

Remote control

IR or RF signal transmitters and receivers are used for GB-PVR remote control. Software makes the interpretation of the signals. With few buttons the user can interact with GB-PVR. Some manufacturers have developed remotes for remote PC wake up.

Playback

 Playback of many video formats, MPEG, AVI, DivX, Xvid, TS, etc.
 Extensible playback mechanism allowing additional file types to be added with correct codecs installed
 Automatic aspect ratio control
 DVD playback from either DVD drive or DVD image on hard disk.
 Supports VMR9/VMR7/Overlay video renderers
 VMR9 full screen Exclusive mode
 Music visualizations.

Plug-ins

Plug-in DLLs go in the gbpvr/plugins directory, and plug-in skins in the skin directory. Usually plug-ins are distributed as zip files, and can be extracted to the gbpvr root directory. When there is a skin which is not available in the plug-ins zip file, it has to be copied into the current skin directory.

Some plug-ins may be configured in the GB-PVR configuration tool, but most of them are configured by editing the plugins Manual/ Skin (skin.xml)

Available in version 1.3.7 (current version 1.3.11 to be confirmed)

	AnimeLibrary (Collection of Anime episodes, images...)
	BurnDVDX2  (DVD creator from MPGs)
	Cinema (Shows information of our local cinemas, time, films...)
	DVB-TRadio (Pluggin for playing DVB-T Radio channels)
	GameZone (Front-end for multiple emulators)
	GraphRecorder (Allow to use an external to record programs for GB-PVR)
	MLPanel (Design screen-savers, picture slide...)
	MovieWiz (Movie manager)
	Music (Fast database driven music player application with free text search and tag edit)
	SkinPlugin (Allows users to browse themes and change the look of GB-PVR on-the-fly.)
	SS2Recorder (Record and watch Live TV by TechniSat)
	Torrents (Torrent files manager using ‘uTorrent’)
	TVListings (TV guide)
	Weather (on demand weather channel)
	WebCams (Allows users to view webcams all around the world)

Client/server support

When configuring the machine which is running GB-PVR, the possibilities are client and server mode. 
The server is responsible of recordings that the clients can schedule. Therefore, clients do not need a recording service. A client PC just can watch TV and recordings from the server, which has to share them. Clients can also use the EPG which runs in the server. 
There are two different sharing modes:
 Streaming (only supports MPEG2)
 File sharing

Other clients supported:
 Hauppauge MediaMVP
 NMT (Network Media Tank)

See also 
Comparison of PVR software packages
Digital video recorder
Hard disk recorder
Home theater PC (HTPC) - also known as "Media PC"
Quiet PC

Notes

References
GB-PVR Capture Cards
GB-PVR Remote Control
GB-PVR Plugin List
GB-PVR PC Client

External links 
GB-PVR Official site 
GB-PVR Documentation wiki 
GB-PVR Forums

Video recording software
Television technology
Television time shifting technology